Huda Sultan or Hoda Sultan (Birth name: Bahiga Abd El Aal, (15 August 1925 – 5 June 2006) was an Egyptian actress and singer. She was also one of the most awarded actress for her roles, especially in musicals in the black and white films where she played secondary and leading roles. Sultan performed in hundreds of films in Egyptian cinema in a 56-year career.

Early life 
Huda Sultan was born on 15 August 1925 in the rural Egyptian city of Tanta to a higher class family. She was the third of five siblings; one of her brothers was the renowned artist Mohamed Fawzi. She was born as Bahiga Abd El-Aal, but later adopted her new acting name, Huda Sultan, after many suggestions from prominent Egyptian Cinema producers that her birth name was too rural.

Career
In 1950 she starred in her first film "Set El Hosn" ("The lady of beauty"); soon after, she married the Egyptian actor Farid Shawqi and the couple had formed a successful duo and acted together in numerous films as well with Egypt's leading actors such as: Salah Zulfikar, Rushdy Abaza and Shoukry Sarhan.

Some of her most notable works are the films; "El Fetewa" ("The Bully"), Ezz El-Dine Zulficar’s "Emra’a Fel Tareeq" ("A Woman in the Road") with Shoukry Sarhan and Rushdy Abaza, "Nessa Muharramat" (Egyptian Arabic: نساء محرمات, "Forbidden Women") with Salah Zulfikar, “Thalath Nesaa” (Egyptian Arabic: ثلاث نساء, “Three Women”) with Salah Zulfikar and Shoukry Sarhan. "Shaye' Fe Sadry" ("Something in My Heart") with Rushdy Abaza. Also Youssef Chahine's "El Ekhtyar" ("The Choice") with Soad Hosny. In 1976, she co-starred in "Awdat Al Ibn Aldal" ("The Return of the Prodigal Son") with Shoukry Sarhan, and "El Wada'a Ya Banobart" ("Adieu Bonaparte") with Salah Zulfikar, Patrice Chéreau and Michel Piccoli. In 1986, Sultan starred in "Min Fadlik Wa Ihsanik" ("Please and Your Kindness") with Salah Zulfikar and Hesham Selim.

Personal life

Marriages
Sultan married five times: her first husband, Mohamed Naguib, was a prominent Egyptian government official who did not agree to his wife's celebrity status and divorced her soon after her first movie. Her second husband was an Egyptian movie producer, and her third husband was Fowad Al-Atrash (brother of singer Farid al-Atrash), she divorced him in order to marry leading actor Farid Shawqi. She then married director Hassan Abdel Salam.

Children
Sultan had one daughter with her first husband, Mohamed Naguib, called Maha, and two daughters with her second husband Shawki, one of them, Nahed, who is a movie producer. Her granddaughter is actress Nahed El Sebai

Death
In 2006 she died, at the age of 81 years, after a battle with lung cancer, at Dar Al Fouad in 6th of October, Egypt.

References

People from Tanta
People from Gharbia Governorate
1925 births
2006 deaths
20th-century Egyptian women singers
Egyptian film actresses
Egyptian television actresses
Deaths from lung cancer
Singers who perform in Egyptian Arabic